Hyagnis spinipes is a species of beetle in the family Cerambycidae. It was described by Breuning in 1962

References

spinipes
Beetles described in 1962